Kühtai Saddle (el. ) is a mountain pass in the Austrian Alps in the Bundesland of Tyrol.

It connects the Ötz river valley from Oetz with Gries im Sellrain. The road from Oetz is 16 km and has a maximum grade of 16 percent. This side is closed to trucking. The road from Gries im Sellrain is 17 km long and also has a maximum grade of 16 percent.

Kühtai
The winter sports resort Kühtai is situated in the saddle. A small village, it is part of the municipality Silz. Population numbers and economic activity in Kühtai are highly seasonal. As of 2001, the number of permanent year-round residents was only 29, but due to the many tourists and seasonal workers, the population is much higher over the winter months.

Etymology
The name "Kühtai" is derived from the Chutay (literally: cow alp), an alpine pasture farm first attested in 1288.

History
A road leading up to Kühtai was first completed in 1628, whereupon the alp farm was converted to a hunting castle/lodge. Holidaymakers first arrived in the eighteen-thirties, and towards the end of the nineteenth century, the hunting castle was converted to a hotel. After the end of the Second World War, Kühtai was developed into a winter sports resort.

Energy
The Längental, Kühtai and Finstertal pumped storage facilities are located in the valley, at different altitudes.

See also
 List of highest paved roads in Europe
 List of mountain passes

External links
 Website of the Kühtai tourism office: summer version, winter version
 Kuhtai Information and Reviews Kuhtai on Mountago

References

Mountain passes of Tyrol (state)
Mountain passes of the Alps
Innsbruck-Land District